United Nations General Assembly resolution ES‑10/L.23 is a resolution of the Tenth emergency special session of the United Nations General Assembly criticizing the Israeli response to the 2018 Gaza border protests. The resolution was sponsored by Algeria, Turkey and the State of Palestine passed with 120 voting in favour, 8 against, and 45 abstentions.

Resolution text 
The full text of Resolution ES-10/L.23:

Voting record

See also
United Nations General Assembly resolution ES-10/19
List of United Nations resolutions concerning Israel
List of United Nations resolutions concerning Palestine
2018 Gaza border protests
Death of Mohammed Sobhi al-Judeili
Rouzan al-Najjar

References

External links
History of key resolutions in the Israel-Palestine conflict

2018 in international relations
2018 in Israel
2018 in the State of Palestine
2018 in the United Nations
June 2018 events in Asia
Israeli–Palestinian conflict and the United Nations
State of Palestine
United Nations General Assembly resolutions concerning Israel
United Nations General Assembly resolutions